Platte Center is a village in Platte County, Nebraska, United States. The population was 336 at the 2010 census.

History
Platte Center was platted in 1880 by the railroad. It was named from its location near the geographical center of Platte County. Platte Center was incorporated as a village in 1885.

Geography
Platte Center is located at  (41.537985, -97.487491).

Demographics

2010 census
As of the census of 2010, there were 336 people, 141 households, and 93 families living in the village. The racial makeup of the village was 97.0% White, 0.3% Asian, and 2.7% from two or more races. Hispanic or Latino of any race were 0.3% of the population.

There were 141 households, of which 29.8% had children under the age of 18 living with them, 53.9% were married couples living together, 7.1% had a female householder with no husband present, 5.0% had a male householder with no wife present, and 34.0% were non-families. 31.9% of all households were made up of individuals, and 14.9% had someone living alone who was 65 years of age or older. The average household size was 2.38 and the average family size was 2.97.

The median age in the village was 40.5 years. 25.9% of residents were under the age of 18; 6.2% were between the ages of 18 and 24; 23.6% were from 25 to 44; 23.9% were from 45 to 64; and 20.5% were 65 years of age or older. The gender makeup of the village was 51.8% male and 48.2% female.

2000 census
As of the census of 2000, there were 359 people, 147 households, and 103 families living in the village. The population density was 1,202.2 people per square mile (462.0/km). There were 159 housing units at an average density of 532.5 per square mile (204.6/km). The racial makeup of the village was 97.0% White, 0.3% African American, 1.4% Asian, 0.3% from other races, and 1.1% from two or more races. Hispanic or Latino of any race were 1.1% of the population.

There were 147 households, out of which 28.6% had children under the age of 18 living with them, 63.3% were married couples living together, 4.8% had a female householder with no husband present, and 29.9% were non-families. 28.6% of all households were made up of individuals, and 14.3% had someone living alone who was 65 years of age or older. The average household size was 2.44 and the average family size was 2.95.

In the village, the population was spread out, with 25.6% under the age of 18, 6.4% from 18 to 24, 25.1% from 25 to 44, 24.5% from 45 to 64, and 18.4% who were 65 years of age or older. The median age was 39 years. For every 100 females, there were 100.6 males. For every 100 females age 18 and over, there were 97.8 males.

As of 2000 the median income for a household in the village was $35,114, and the median income for a family was $40,357. Males had a median income of $27,813 versus $20,938 for females. The per capita income for the village was $16,438. About 2.2% of families and 5.1% of the population were below the poverty line, including none of those under age 18 and 8.5% of those age 65 or over.

Notable person
 General Alfred Maximilian Gruenther – World War II general and NATO's Supreme Allied Commander in Europe (SACEUR) (1953–1956)

References

External links
 
 

Villages in Platte County, Nebraska
Villages in Nebraska